Allegra Acosta (born December 12, 2002) is an American actress and singer best known for playing the role of Molly Hernandez in the Hulu original series Marvel's Runaways.

Career
Allegra Acosta started singing and dancing at a young age. She and her family moved to Los Angeles so that she could pursue a serious career. She was cast as Molly Hernandez, a character based on Molly Hayes, on Marvel's Runaways which airs on Hulu as part of its original programming.

Filmography

Film

Television

References

External links

2002 births
Living people
21st-century American actresses
American actresses of Mexican descent
American television actresses
American child actresses
Hispanic and Latino American actresses
21st-century American women singers
21st-century American singers